Magnus Stangeland (born 17 March 1941 in Austevoll) is a Norwegian politician for the Centre Party.

He was elected to the Norwegian Parliament from Hordaland in 1985, and was re-elected on two occasions. He had previously served in the position of deputy representative during the term 1981–1985.

Stangeland was a member of Austevoll municipal council from 1971 to 1983, serving as mayor in the periods 1975–1979 and 1979–1981. From 1981 to 1983 he was also a member of Hordaland county council.

In a lower court, he had been sentenced to 60 days in prison on charges of fraud. In 2011, Borgarting Court of Appeal acquitted him on charges of fraud. He was ordered to pay Norwegian kroner 100,000 for court costs. Riksadvokaten has appealed for the case to be tried by the Supreme Court.

References

1941 births
Living people
Members of the Storting
Mayors of places in Hordaland
Centre Party (Norway) politicians
20th-century Norwegian politicians
People from Austevoll